Qeshlaq-e Azat (also Romanized as Qeshlāq-e ʿAzat) is a village in Qeshlaq-e Jonubi Rural District, Qeshlaq Dasht District, Bileh Savar County, Ardabil Province, Iran. At the 2006 census, its population was 17, in 5 families.

References 

Towns and villages in Bileh Savar County